Valmala is a municipality located in the province of Burgos, Castile and León, Spain. There is a Catholic church from the 13th century. It is located in Sierra de la Demanda.

References

Municipalities in the Province of Burgos